Jacques-Yvan Morin,  (born July 15, 1931 in Quebec City, Quebec) is a former professor of law and a politician in Quebec, Canada. Morin graduated from the McGill University Faculty of Law with a BCL in 1953, where he was the founder of the McGill Law Journal. He taught international and constitutional law at Université de Montréal from 1958 until 1973. He was deputy director of the Canadian Yearbook of International Law from 1963 to 1973 and founded the Quebec Journal of International Law in 1984.

From 1966 to 1969, he chaired the Estates General of French Canada and joined in 1970 the Quebec sovereignty movement. He became president of the Mouvement national des Québécois in 1971. He failed to win a seat in Bourassa in the 1970 Quebec provincial election but won a seat in the riding of Sauvé in the 1973 election. After the latter election the Parti québécois became the official opposition since the former opposition party, the Union Nationale, had failed to win any seats. Since  the party leader, René Lévesque, had not won a seat in the 1973 election, Morin became leader of the Opposition in the National Assembly until the 1976 election, which the Parti québécois won. As a member of Lévesque's government, Morin was appointed successively Minister of Education (1976–1981), Cultural and Scientific Development (1981–1982) and Intergovernmental Affairs (1982–1984). During those years, he also served as Deputy Premier of Quebec.

Morin returned to teaching in 1984 at Université de Montréal, where he became professor emeritus in 1997.

In 2001, he was made a Grand Officer of the National Order of Quebec. Other honours include the Rights and Freedoms Prize of the Commission on Human Rights in Quebec (2000) and the Prix René-Chaloult of the Association of Former Parliamentarians (2011).

See also
Politics of Quebec
Quebec general elections
List of Quebec leaders of the Opposition
Timeline of Quebec history

External links

 

1931 births
Deputy premiers of Quebec
French Quebecers
Grand Officers of the National Order of Quebec
Living people
Parti Québécois MNAs
Politicians from Quebec City
McGill University Faculty of Law alumni
McGill Law Journal editors